Khodabandeh County is in Zanjan province, Iran. The capital of the county is the city of Qeydar. At the 2006 census, the county's population was 161,696 in 36,121 households. The following census in 2011 counted 169,553 people in 45,355 households. At the 2016 census, the county's population was 164,493 in 47,599 households. Do Tappeh District was established in 2019 from Howmeh Rural District, was divided into two rural districts, and has no cities.

Administrative divisions

The population history and structural changes of Khodabandeh County's administrative divisions over three consecutive censuses are shown in the following table. The latest census shows four districts, 10 rural districts, and seven cities.

References

 

Counties of Zanjan Province